Plesictis is an extinct prehistoric genus of mustelid (originally described as a procyonid) endemic to Europe during the Oligocene and Miocene 33.9—20.0 Ma existing for approximately .

Its large eyes and very long tail suggest that it may have been nocturnal and arboreal. Judging from its teeth, it was an omnivore.

References

Prehistoric mustelids
Oligocene caniforms
Miocene mustelids
Oligocene mammals of Europe
Fossil taxa described in 1846
Miocene mammals of Europe
Prehistoric carnivoran genera